Phyllonorycter lemarchandi is a moth of the family Gracillariidae. It is known from Madagascar.

The length of the forewings is 2–2.3 mm. The forewing ground colour is yellowish-ochreous with white markings. The hindwings are pale grey with a long pale greyish ochreous fringe of lighter shading than the hindwing. Adults are on wing in early September and from late December to early January.

The larvae feed on Sida rhombifolia and Solanum species. They mine the leaves of their host plant. The mine has the form of an abaxial, oval, blotch-mine situated close to the base of the leaflet.

References

Moths described in 1951
lemarchandi
Moths of Madagascar